The Municipality of Dobrepolje is a municipality in Slovenia. The administrative seat of the municipality is in Videm. The area is part of the traditional region of Lower Carniola. The municipality is now included in the Central Slovenia Statistical Region.

Settlements
In addition to the municipal seat of Videm, the municipality also includes the following settlements:

 Bruhanja Vas
 Cesta
 Četež pri Strugah
 Hočevje
 Kolenča Vas
 Kompolje
 Lipa
 Mala Vas
 Paka
 Podgora
 Podgorica
 Podpeč
 Podtabor
 Ponikve
 Potiskavec
 Predstruge
 Pri Cerkvi–Struge
 Rapljevo
 Tisovec
 Tržič
 Vodice
 Zagorica
 Zdenska Vas

References

External links
 
 Municipality of Dobrepolje on Geopedia
 Dobrepolje municipal site

 
Dobrepolje
1994 establishments in Slovenia